Sophie Fedorovitch (3 December 1893 – 25 January 1953) was a Russian-born theatrical designer who worked with ballet choreographer Sir Frederick Ashton from his first choreographed ballet in 1926 until her accidental death in 1953.

Fedorovitch designed for several British choreographers including Ninette de Valois and Antony Tudor, as well as for opera and theatre. From 1951 until her death in 1953, she was a member of the artistic advisory panel of Sadler's Wells Ballet, a role she had unofficially undertaken for many years.

In her 2012 article in Research in Dance Education, Elizabeth McLean's view was that Fedorovitch  had a "formative influence" on British ballet design of the 1930s and 1940s, and that she should be considered the equal of her contemporary, Christian Bérard.

Early life
Fedorovitch was born and raised in Minsk, Russian Empire (now Belarus) and studied painting in Kraków, Moscow, and St Petersburg. She migrated from Russia to England in 1920. She was established as a painter until she met Ashton, after which she increasingly came to devote her career to set and costume design.

Career
Ashton and Fedorovitch met in 1925, introduced by Marie Rambert, who had met her in 1921. They worked together from A Tragedy of Fashion, Ashton's first ballet in 1926. Costumes and scenery were by Fedorovitch, who continued to work with Ashton for more than twenty years, and became, in his words, "not only my dearest friend but my greatest artistic collaborator and adviser". As a friend and collaborator, she did most of her early works for Ashton. Altogether, they collaborated on eleven works.

In 1940, Fedorovitch did stage design and "simple but gorgeous costumes" for choreographer Andrée Howard's best known work La fête étrange, for London Ballet, based on an episode in Alain Fournier's novel Le Grand Meaulnes. It has been performed over 200 times by The Royal Ballet, and by Scottish Ballet.

Her confidants, in addition to Ashton, included Barbara Ker-Seymer, Olivia Wyndham, Marty Mann and Lucy Norton.

Death
 Fedorovitch died as a result of a gas leak at her house at 22 Bury Walk, Chelsea. The house, known as the "Gothic Box", was left to Simon Fleet, later mentor to fellow interior designer Nicky Haslam. A memorial plaque to "Sophie Fedorovitch, costume designer" was subsequently erected there.

Ashton dedicated A Month in the Country to her memory.

Designs created

 
 1933 - Les Masques, for Frederick Ashton
 
 
 
 
 
 
 
 
 1948 - La traviata, for Covent Garden Opera (now The Royal Opera)
 1950 - Madama Butterfly, for Covent Garden Opera (now The Royal Opera)

References

1893 births
1953 deaths
Russian designers
Russian costume designers
Ballet designers
Opera designers
Artists from Minsk
Accidental deaths in London
People from Chelsea, London
Artists from London
Emigrants from the Russian Empire to the United Kingdom